Cosmopterix baihashanella is a moth of the family Cosmopterigidae. It is known from Beijing, China.

The length of the forewings is about 5.3 mm.

References

baihashanella